In enzymology, a glucose-fructose oxidoreductase is an enzyme that catalyzes the chemical reaction

D-glucose + D-fructose  D-gluconolactone + D-glucitol

Thus, the two substrates of this enzyme are D-glucose and D-fructose, whereas its two products are D-gluconolactone and D-glucitol.

This enzyme belongs to the family of oxidoreductases, specifically those acting on the CH-OH group of donor with other acceptors.  The systematic name of this enzyme class is D-glucose:D-fructose oxidoreductase.

Structural studies

References

 
 
 

EC 1.1.99
Enzymes of known structure